Chiraphan Nanthawong (born 17 August 1999) is a Thai weightlifter.

She participated at the 2018 World Weightlifting Championships, winning a medal.

References

External links

1999 births
Living people
Chiraphan Nanthawong
World Weightlifting Championships medalists
Chiraphan Nanthawong